The 56th Filmfare Awards were held on 29 January 2011 at the Yash Raj Studios in Mumbai, honouring the best in film for the year 2010. The nominations were announced on 13 January. The date of the function was unusual because generally the awards are hosted on the last Saturday of February. The date of the telecast is 6 February 2011.

My Name Is Khan led the ceremony with 10 nominations, followed by Dabangg and Udaan with 9 nominations each.

Udaan won 7 awards, including Best Film (Critics) (for Vikramaditya Motwane) and Best Supporting Actor (for Ronit Roy), thus becoming the most-awarded film at the ceremony.

Sisters Ratna Pathak Shah and Supriya Pathak were nominated for Best Supporting Actress for their performances in Golmaal 3 and Khichdi: The Movie respectively, but both lost to Kareena Kapoor who won the award for We Are Family.

Awards and nominees

Main awards

Critics' Awards

Technical Awards

Special awards

Multiple wins
The following films received multiple awards and nominations.

Partners 
 Idea Cellular – Title Sponsor
 PC Jeweller – Associate Sponsor
 Sony Entertainment Television – Telecast Partner
 Whyte and Mackay from United Spirits – Beverage Partner
 Bright Outdoor Media – Outdoor partner
 Big Cinemas – Multiplex Partner

See also
 Filmfare Awards
 Bollywood films of 2010

References

External links
 Nominations for 56th Filmfare Awards 2010 at Bollywood Hungama.
 Winners of 56th Filmfare Awards 2010.

Filmfare Awards
Filmfare

fr:Filmfare Awards 2010